Shibar Pass (Kowtal-e Shibar) in Afghanistan is situated at a height of  above sea-level, connecting Parwan Province with Bamyan Province. It is the longer of the two main routes from Kabul to Bamiyan. It was originally designed and built by Ahmad Shah Shairzay and a German engineer between 1933 and 1938. It is noted to be an important mountain pass of the country.

The route to Bamyan via Unai Pass and Hajigak Pass in Maidan Wardak is shorter and more direct, but also more difficult, rising to 3,700 m, and is not usually preferred in the winters.

References

Mountain passes of Afghanistan
Landforms of Bamyan Province
Hazarajat
Landforms of Parwan Province